Kumki is a town in Arunachal Pradesh in the district of Changlang. It is one of the easternmost permanently populated towns of India.

References

Cities and towns in Changlang district